The 1993–94 Football championship of Ukraine among amateurs was the second season of the nationwide amateur competitions in the independent Ukraine and was known as the football competitions of fitness collectives or KFK for short. The tournament was conducted under auspices of the Football Federation of Ukraine before creation of the Ukrainian Football Amateur Association.

As last year, the competition consisted of six groups that were divided by regional principal. The number of teams that competed has increased to 87 teams.

The top two of each group were allowed to enter the transitional league next season.

Teams

Location map

Composition

Group 1

Group 2

Group 3
Relocated
Budivelnyk Ivankiv to Brovary

Group 4
Renamed
Ayaks Krasnyi Luch was called Koral
Metalurh Lutuhine was called MALS

Group 5

Group 6

Promotion
To the 1994–95 Ukrainian Third League were promoted all six group winners and their six runners-up (total 12 teams) FC LAZ Lviv, FC Lada Chernivtsi, FC Advis Khmelnytskyi, FC Keramik Baranivka, FC Transimpeks Vyshneve, FC Sula Lubny, FC Avanhard Rovenky, FC Vahonobudivnyk Kremenchuk, FC Metalurh Novomoskovsk, FC Shakhtar Horlivka, FC Tavria Novotroitske, FC Dnistrovets Bilhorod-Dnistrovskyi.

External links
 Season's results  at FootPass. Football Federation of Ukraine

Ukrainian Football Amateur League seasons
5